IF is an upcoming American fantasy comedy film written, directed, and produced by John Krasinski. The film features an ensemble cast consisting of Ryan Reynolds, Krasinski, Phoebe Waller-Bridge, Fiona Shaw, Cailey Fleming, Bobby Moynihan, Louis Gossett Jr., and Steve Carell. 

IF is scheduled to be released in the United States on May 24, 2024, by Paramount Pictures.

Premise
The film is about a child's journey to rediscover their imagination.

Cast
 Ryan Reynolds
 John Krasinski
 Steve Carell
 Cailey Fleming
 Phoebe Waller-Bridge
 Fiona Shaw
 Louis Gossett Jr.
 Bobby Moynihan
 Alan Kim

Production

Development
In October 2019, Paramount Pictures outbid Lionsgate and Sony among others to win the rights to Imaginary Friends, a project developed by John Krasinski and Ryan Reynolds, with Krasinski set to direct. In May 2021, Krasinski's Sunday Night Productions and Reynolds's Maximum Effort signed first-look deals with Paramount. In October 2021, Phoebe Waller-Bridge and Fiona Shaw joined the cast. In January 2022, Steve Carell, Alan Kim, Cailey Fleming, and Louis Gossett Jr. joined the cast. The film reunites Krasinski and Carell, who starred in The Office (2005–2013). In August 2022, Bobby Moynihan was added to the cast.

Filming
Principal photography began on August 31, 2022, with Janusz Kamiński as the cinematographer.

Release
IF is scheduled to be released in theaters by Paramount Pictures on May 24, 2024. It was originally scheduled for November 17, 2023.

References

External links
 

Upcoming films
2024 films
2020s American films
2020s English-language films
2020s fantasy comedy films
American fantasy comedy films
Films directed by John Krasinski
Films produced by Andrew Form
Films produced by Ryan Reynolds
Films with screenplays by John Krasinski
Paramount Pictures films
Upcoming English-language films